"Oh! Gravity." is a song written and recorded by the American rock band Switchfoot, and is the title track from their sixth  studio album of the same name. The song impacted radio on October 31, 2006, but was made available for free streaming on their website and MySpace in early October, and had found its way onto radio well before the release date.

The track was released for purchase on iTunes on October 21, 2006, along with a 17-minute interview in which the band talked about each of the songs on the then-upcoming album. 

According to songwriter Jon Foreman, the song is a "generational appeal for peace, love, and understanding".

Music video
The music video for this single first premiered on Yahoo! Music on November 13, 2006.  The video used  green screen technology to superimpose the album's graphical artwork all around the band members, who themselves appear to be spinning in an anti-gravity field. At the end of the video, Foreman's face morphs into the middle face on the album artwork.

Reception
On the radio, it achieved moderate success, peaking at # 36 on the U.S. Modern Rock charts. The song was also Top 10 on Christian Rock, Top 15 on Christian Hit Radio and # 11 on the Bubbling Under Hot 100 chart.

In the media

The song is on the soundtrack for MLB 07: The Show.
The song can also be heard in trailers for the 2007 MTV show, "Life of Ryan." It was the official theme song of the show.

Charts

References

External links
Music video
Switchfoot Podcast Episode 12 - Oh! Gravity. Video Shoot

2006 singles
Switchfoot songs
Songs written by Jon Foreman
Song recordings produced by Steve Lillywhite
Songs written by Tim Foreman